Bottom is used in the name of several geographical features:

Bottom, North Carolina, small unincorporated community in the Stewarts Creek Township of northern Surry County, North Carolina
Bottom Bay, on the southeast coast of Barbados, between Cave Bay and Palmetto Bay
Bottom Creek, West Virginia, unincorporated community in McDowell County, West Virginia, USA
Bottom Points railway station, railway station on the Zig Zag Railway in the Blue Mountains area of New South Wales
Bottom Wood,  woodland in the English county of Buckinghamshire, near the hamlet of Studley Green
The Bottom (formerly Botte), the capital and largest town of the island of Saba, the Caribbean Netherlands

A number of valleys or low-lying areas are described as bottoms, as are their associated settlements:
American Bottom, the flood plain of the Mississippi River in the Metro-East region of Southern Illinois
Aunt Mary's Bottom, an  biological Site of Special Scientific Interest in Dorset, England
Ballingdon Bottom, a hamlet in Hertfordshire, England
Beacon's Bottom, also known as Bacon's Bottom, is a hamlet between Piddington and Stokenchurch in England
Beck Bottom, village in Cumbria, England
Beech Bottom, Tennessee, unincorporated community in Macon County, Tennessee, in the United States
Beech Bottom, West Virginia, village in Brooke County, West Virginia, along the Ohio River
Big Bottom, South Dakota, ghost town in Meade County, South Dakota, United States of America (1878–1887)
Big Creek Bottom, medium-sized creek located in Union Parish, Louisiana, United States
Black Bottom, Alabama, unincorporated community in Cullman County, Alabama, United States
Black Bottom, Detroit, predominantly black neighborhood in Detroit, Michigan
Black Bottom, Kentucky, unincorporated community in Harlan County, Kentucky, United States
Black Bottom, Philadelphia, predominantly African American and poor neighborhood in West Philadelphia, Pennsylvania
Black Bottom, West Virginia, unincorporated community in Logan County, West Virginia, United States
Black Bottom Crater, volcanic crater located in Arizona, east-northeast of Sunset Crater, and west-southwest of Roden Crater
Brazeau Bottom, alluvial floodplain extending along the Mississippi River in Perry County, Missouri
Chickengrove Bottom, biological Site of Special Scientific Interest southeast of the village of Bowerchalke in Wiltshire, UK
Clabber Bottom, Kentucky, unincorporated community located in Scott County, Kentucky, United States
Clover Bottom, Missouri, unincorporated community in Franklin County, in the U.S. state of Missouri
Combe Bottom, Site of Special Scientific Interest in Surrey, England
Crumps Bottom, West Virginia, unincorporated community in Summers County, West Virginia, United States
Davis Bottom, Lexington, neighborhood just southwest of downtown Lexington, Kentucky, United States
Dilles Bottom, Ohio, unincorporated community in Belmont County, in the U.S. state of Ohio
Emu Bottom, historic homestead near Sunbury, Victoria, Australia
Esgyrn Bottom, Site of Special Scientific Interest in Pembrokeshire, South Wales
False Bottom Creek, stream in the U.S. state of South Dakota
Fawley Bottom, very small village in south Buckinghamshire, England, north of Henley-on-Thames
Flint Bottom Creek, stream in Ste. Genevieve County in the U.S. state of Missouri
Foggy Bottom, one of the oldest late 18th and 19th-century neighborhoods in Washington, D.C.
Foggy Bottom (Washington Metro), Washington Metro station
Forgotten Bottom, former name of the Gray's Ferry neighborhood of Philadelphia, PA
Fraziers Bottom, West Virginia, unincorporated community in Putnam County, West Virginia, United States
George's Bottom, cave in the British Overseas Territory of Gibraltar
Gillman Bottom, West Virginia, unincorporated community in Logan County, West Virginia, United States
Gold Bottom, Yukon, near the Blackstone River Mining Concern
Green Bottom, Cornwall, hamlet in the parish of Kenwyn in Cornwall, England
Hammer Bottom, hamlet in the Chichester district in the county of West Sussex
Honey Bottom, hamlet in Berkshire, England, and part of the civil parish of Boxford
Hop Bottom, Pennsylvania, Borough of Susquehanna County, Pennsylvania, United States
Icehouse Bottom, prehistoric Native American site in Monroe County, Tennessee, United States
Indian Bottom, Kentucky, unincorporated community in Letcher County, Kentucky, United States
Jackson Bottom, 725-acre wetlands area along the Tualatin River in Washington County, Oregon
Jolly's Bottom, in west Cornwall, England, United Kingdom
Locks Bottom, area of Greater London, England, part of the London Borough of Bromley
Locust Bottom, aka Rollingwood Farm, historic home and national historic district located near Haymarket, Prince William County, Virginia
Long Bottom, Ohio, unincorporated community in southern Olive Township, Meigs County, Ohio, United States
Lulsgate Bottom, location of Bristol Airport, England
Marlow Bottom, large linear village occupying a valley to the north of Marlow, Buckinghamshire
Meems Bottom, covered bridge in Shenandoah County, Virginia, United States
Melton Bottom, East Riding of Yorkshire, England
Mercers Bottom, West Virginia, unincorporated community in Mason County, West Virginia, USA
Mossy Bottom, Kentucky, unincorporated community and coal town in Pike County, Kentucky, United States
Mound Bottom, prehistoric Native American complex in Cheatham County, Tennessee, located in the Southeastern United States
Muses Bottom, West Virginia, unincorporated community in Jackson County, West Virginia, United States
Newham Bottom, in the Forest of Dean, Gloucestershire, England, to the west of Cinderford
Nohead Bottom, Virginia, unincorporated community in Middlesex County, Virginia, United States
Owslebury Bottom, small village in the civil parish of Owslebury in the City of Winchester district of Hampshire, England
Paradise Bottom, on the south-west side the Avon Gorge, close to the Clifton Suspension Bridge, within North Somerset
Park Bottom, hamlet north of Pool and near Illogan in west Cornwall, England
Peach Bottom, Pennsylvania, unincorporated village in Fulton Township, Lancaster County, Pennsylvania, United States
Pednor Bottom, hamlet in the parish of Chartridge, in Buckinghamshire, England
Pettry Bottom, West Virginia, unincorporated community in Raleigh County, West Virginia
Plum Bottom Creek, stream located entirely within Geauga County, Ohio
Pratt's Bottom, village now in the London Borough of Bromley, but historically part of Kent
Ridley Bottom, Tidenham,  nature reserve in Gloucestershire
River Bottom, Oklahoma, census-designated place (CDP) in Muskogee County, Oklahoma, United States
Rock Bottom Creek, tributary of Roaring Brook in Lackawanna County, Pennsylvania, in the United States
Rocky Bottom, South Carolina, located in northern Pickens County, South Carolina
Round Bottom, West Virginia, unincorporated community in Wetzel County, West Virginia
Rucker's Bottom, archaeological site on the Upper Savannah River in Elbert County, Georgia
Sarratt Bottom, biological Site of Special Scientific Interest in Sarratt, Hertfordshire, UK
Scott's Bottom, park in southwestern Wyoming and is maintained by the city of Green River, Wyoming
Scratchy Bottom (or Scratchy's Bottom), clifftop valley between Durdle Door and Swyre Head in Dorset, England
Sheffield Bottom, a lock on the Kennet and Avon Canal, in the civil parish of Burghfield in the English county of Berkshire
Ship Bottom, New Jersey, borough in Ocean County, New Jersey, United States
Shockoe Bottom, area in Richmond, Virginia, just east of downtown, along the James River
Six Mile Bottom, hamlet within the parish of Little Wilbraham, near Cambridge in England
Skinner's Bottom, hamlet near Porthtowan in west Cornwall, England, United Kingdom
Stony Bottom, West Virginia, unincorporated community located in Pocahontas County, West Virginia, USA
Superior Bottom, West Virginia, unincorporated community in Logan County, West Virginia, United States
Tanyard Bottom, also known as Tech Flats, was a shantytown just south of Georgia Tech along Techwood Drive
Thompson's Bottom, hamlet in the North Kesteven district of Lincolnshire, England
Walnut Bottom, Pennsylvania, unincorporated community in Cumberland County, Pennsylvania, United States
Walnut Bottom, West Virginia, unincorporated community in Hardy County, West Virginia, USA
Washington Bottom, 19th-century Greek Revival plantation house and farm north of Romney, West Virginia, USA
West Bottom, Virginia, unincorporated community in Fluvanna County, in the U.S. state of Virginia
Youngs Bottom, West Virginia, unincorporated community in Kanawha County, West Virginia

See also
Bottom (disambiguation)
Bottom (surname)

Geography-related lists